Kfar HaMaccabi (lit. Village of the Maccabis) is a kibbutz in northern Israel. Located near Kiryat Ata, it falls under the jurisdiction of Zevulun Regional Council.

History
The village was founded in 1936 by members of Maccabi youth movement from Czechoslovakia and Germany who immigrated with the help of Menachem Ussishkin for the first Maccabiah Games in 1932. The kibbutz was named for the youth movement.

Economy
The kibbutz is now one of Israel's largest animal feed manufacturers.
This branch of income has been sold as have other branches.  The new owners pay rent and the salary of the members that work in the branches.

Notable people
 Theodore Bikel
 Nachum Heiman

References

1936 establishments in Mandatory Palestine
Kibbutzim
Kibbutz Movement
Populated places established in 1936
Populated places in Haifa District
Czech-Jewish culture in Israel
German-Jewish culture in Israel
Slovak-Jewish culture in Israel